Abdolreza Ghanbari (born ) is an Iranian university lecturer convicted of Moharebeh (waging war against God) currently awaiting execution in Iran.

Ghanbari is lecturer at Payam e Nour University, and married father of two. In 2007, he was detained for 120 days and sentenced to a six-month suspension from teaching and exiled from Sari to Pakdasht. He was arrested at his home in Pakdasht (southwest of the capital of Tehran) on January 4, 2010 in the wake of Ashura (December 27, 2009) protest against the election of President Ahmadinejad. He was held at Evin Prison, and confessed under duress to charges. He was sentenced to death by Judge Salavati in branch 15 of the Islamic Revolutionary Court on the charge of “Moharebeh through ties with hostile groups [against] the regime”. Possession of suspicious e-mails and contact with one of the TV stations outside Iran were cited as reasons [to justify] the charges.

His death sentence was confirmed by Tehran's Appeal Court, Branch 36 in April 2010. His Death sentence was commuted to imprisonment in September 2010 but this seems to have been overturned and a request for pardon of the death sentence was rejected on February 28, 2012 by the Commission of Justice in Tehran, clearing the way for authorities to proceed with his execution.  Complicating his situation is the fact that his lawyer Nasrin Sotoudeh was herself condemned to a six-year sentence in Evin prison for "propaganda against the regime" and "acting against national security".

Abdolreza Ghanbari’s wife and mother of two, Sakineh Habibi, is fighting his conviction and sentence and is quoted as saying:

See also
Human rights in Iran
Moharebeh

Notes

Year of birth missing (living people)
Living people
Prisoners and detainees of Iran